The Anita Borg Institute Women of Vision Awards honor exceptional technical women. Three awards are presented by the Anita Borg Institute for Women and Technology each year, recognizing women in the categories of Innovation, Leadership, and Social Impact.

Awards
The Anita Borg Institute Women of Vision Award for Innovation recognizes a woman for her contributions to technology innovation and progress.

The Anita Borg Institute Women of Vision Award for Social Impact recognizes a woman has changed the way technology effects society.

The Anita Borg Institute Women of Vision Award for Leadership recognizes a woman for her demonstrated leadership.

Anita Borg Institute Women of Vision Awards Banquet
The awards are presented annually at a banquet in Silicon Valley. The awards banquet has featured notable keynote speakers, including Anousheh Ansari (2011), Arianna Huffington (2010), Padmasree Warrior (2009), Diane Greene (2008), Esther Dyson (2007), and John L. Hennessy (2005).

Anita Borg Top Company for Technical Woman Award
Beginning in 2011, the winner of the Anita Borg Top Company for Technical Women Award is honored at the awards banquet. A representative from the winning company receives the award and gives an acceptance speech.

List of Anita Borg Institute Women of Vision Award winners

In 2015, the awards were updated to include the Student of Vision Award. "This award honors young women dedicated to creating a future where the people who imagine and build technology mirror the people and societies for which they build it." The award for technology entrepreneurship was also added.

See also

 List of awards honoring women
 List of computer-related awards
 Anita Borg Institute for Women and Technology
 Anita Borg
 Telle Whitney

External links
 Anita Borg Institute Women of Vision Awards

References

Awards honoring women
Computer-related awards
Awards established in 2005
2005 establishments in the United States
American awards